The Mill is a 1641 print by Rembrandt, only known in a single state. Copies of it are in the Rijksmuseum, the Metropolitan Museum of Art, and most large print rooms.

References

1641 works
Prints by Rembrandt